Shukla is a surname of Sanskrit origin.

Shukla may also refer to:

Places 
 Shukla, Bhopal, in Madhya Pradesh India
 Shuklaganj, in Unnao district, Uttar Pradesh, India

Other uses 
 Shukla paksha, the bright lunar fortnight in the Hindu calendar
 Shukla Yajurveda, a Hindu text
 Pandit Ravishankar Shukla University, Raipur, Chhattisgarh, India
 Ravishankar Shukla Stadium, a sports venue in Jabalpur, Madhya Pradesh, India
 12596 Shukla, a minor planet